Euphrasia ruptura (former synonym: Euphrasia sp. Tamworth) is a presumed extinct plant from the genus Euphrasia within the family Orobanchaceae.

It was first described in 1997 by William R. Barker from a single collection made in the Tamworth Area, Northern Tablelands, New South Wales in 1904. It is named after the Australian botanist Herman Montague Rucker Rupp who discovered this species.

Description
This perennial subshrub reaches a height of at least 26 centimetres. The branchlets are covered with hair and have 22 to 25 leave pairs. The length of the calyx reaches from 3.8 to 4.5 millimetres. The corolla measures from 8 to 10.8 millimetres. The color is unknown. The tube is about five millimetres long and the stamens with the anthers 0.9 x 1.7 millimetres.

Status
This plant is only known from two flowering branches collected in September 1904 in the North Western Slopes near Tamworth.

References

External links
New South Wales Flora Online - Euphrasia ruptura
Taxonomic studies in Euphrasia (Scrophulariaceae). VIII. E. ruptura, a name for a species apparently extinct in northeastern New South Wales

ruptura
Flora of New South Wales
Extinct flora of Australia
Lamiales of Australia
Plants described in 1997
Taxa named by William Robert Barker